Hay que deshacer la casa is a 1983 Spanish comedy film directed by Jose Luis Garcia Sanchez. It is based on a stage play by Sebastián Junyent. Amparo Rivelles won the 1st Goya Awards for Best Actress in 1987.

Cast

References

External links
 

Spanish comedy films
1983 comedy films
1983 films
Films directed by José Luis García Sánchez
Films with screenplays by Rafael Azcona
Films shot in Madrid
Films set in Paris
Films set in Guadalajara